Take No Prisoners (2008) was the inaugural Take No Prisoners professional wrestling pay-per-view (PPV) event produced by Ring of Honor (ROH). It took place on March 16, 2008 from the Pennsylvania National Guard Armory in Philadelphia, Pennsylvania.

Results

See also
2008 in professional wrestling
List of Ring of Honor pay-per-view events

References

External links
ROHwrestling.com

Events in Philadelphia
2008 in Philadelphia
ROH Take No Prisoners
Professional wrestling in Philadelphia
March 2008 events in the United States
2008 Ring of Honor pay-per-view events